Girls is the debut Japanese extended play by Exo-CBX, the first official sub-unit of the South Korean-Chinese boy group Exo. It was released on May 24, 2017 by Avex Trax and distributed by Avex Music Creative. The EP features seven tracks in total including the Japanese version of their debut Korean single Hey Mama! and a bonus track that will be included only in the first edition of the album.

Background and release 
On March 10, 2017, it was revealed via a livestream that the Exo-CBX would have their debut in Japan later that year, sometime in May. On April 1, 2017 it was announced that EXO-CBX will release a Japanese EP entitled Girls on May 24, 2017. On April 26, it was revealed that the mini album will be released in four versions; The CD and DVD 'CBX' version, which includes the music video for "Ka-CHING!" and an off-shot movie, as well as the three CD only versions, 'Chen', 'Baekhyun' and 'Xiumin'. The track list of the extended play were released also on the same day. On April 28, a teaser of the title track "Ka-CHING!" was released. It was revealed that the song will be used as an ending theme for the "Nihon Terebi" show. On May 1, a short music video of the title track "Ka-CHING!" was released. Two additional, group teaser images also were released on the same day. On May 15, a highlight medley, featuring previews of the album's tracks was released. The EP was officially released on May 24.

Promotions

Live performance 
EXO-CBX performed "Ka-CHING!" and "Hey Mama!", the Japanese version, for the first time at the 2017 Girls Awards on May 3, 2017.

On June 7, the group performed "Girl Problems" for the first time on Exo-CBX "Colorful BoX" Free Showcase. The group also performed  "Ka-CHING!" and "Hey Mama!".

On August 26, EXO-CBX performed "Hey Mama!", "Girl Problems" and "Ka-CHING!" on a-nation concert in Japan.

Commercial performance 
The special edition (Only available for EXO-L Japan) version of "Girls" was sold out in less than an hour upon its release, making the sub-group the fastest selling K-pop group in Japan, breaking their parent group's record.

"Girls" debuted at No. 2 on the Oricon Daily Albums Chart and selling 26,541 copies on its first day of release.

"Girls" is ranked No. 37 in Oricon's Top 100 albums of 2017 with sales of 59,656.

Track listing

DVD 
 Ka-CHING! -Video Clip-
 Off Shot Movie (※初回盤のみ収録)

Charts

Sales

Release history

References

External links 
 "Ka-CHING!" music video short version

2017 debut EPs
Avex Trax albums
Japanese-language EPs
J-pop EPs
Exo-CBX EPs